The Anglo-French Wars were a series of conflicts between England (and after 1707, Britain) and France. Those include the following.

Middle Ages

High Middle Ages

 Anglo-French War (1109–1113) – first conflict between the Capetian Dynasty and the House of Normandy post-Norman conquest
 Anglo-French War (1116–1119) – conflict over English possession of Normandy
 Anglo-French War (1123–1135) – conflict that amalgamated into The Anarchy
 Anglo-French War (1158–1189) – first conflict between the Capetian Dynasty and the House of Plantagenet
 Anglo-French War (1193–1199) – conflict between King Richard the Lionheart and King Philip Augustus
 Anglo-French War (1202–1204) – French invasion of Normandy
 Anglo-French War (1213–1214) – conflict between King Philip Augustus and King John of England 
 Anglo-French War (1215–1217) – the French intervention in the First Barons War
 Anglo-French War (1224) – known as the Poitou War
 Anglo-French War (1242–1243) – known as the Saintonge War

Late Middle Ages
 Anglo-French War (1294–1303) – known as the Guyenne War
 Anglo-French War (1324) – known as the War of Saint-Sardos
 Anglo-French War (1337–1453) – the Hundred Years' War and its peripheral conflicts, often broken up into:
 Edwardian War (1337–1360)
 Caroline War (1369–1389)
 Lancastrian War (1415–1453)
 Anglo-French War (1496–1498) – part of the Italian War of 1494–1498

Modern period

1500s and 1600s
 Anglo-French War (1512–1514) – part of the War of the League of Cambrai
 Anglo-French War (1522–1526) – part of the Italian War of 1521–1526
 Anglo-French War (1542–1546) – part of the Italian War of 1542–1546
 Anglo-French War (1557–1559) – part of the Italian War of 1551–1559
 English expedition to France (1562-1563) - English intervention in the first of the French Wars of Religion.
 Anglo-French War (1627–1629) – the English intervention during the Huguenot rebellions
 Anglo-French War (1666-1667) – minor corollary of the Second Anglo-Dutch War
 Anglo-French War (1689–1697) – part of the Nine Years' War and its peripheral conflicts

1700s
 Anglo-French War (1702–1713) – part of the War of the Spanish Succession and its peripheral conflicts
 Anglo-French War (1744–1748) – part of the War of the Austrian Succession and its peripheral conflicts
 Anglo-French War (1746–1763) – also known as the Carnatic Wars
 Anglo-French War (1756–1763) – part of the Seven Years' War and its peripheral conflicts
 Anglo-French War (1778–1783) – part of the American Revolutionary War and its peripheral conflicts
 Anglo-French War (1793–1802) – part of the French Revolutionary Wars and their peripheral conflicts

After 1802
 Anglo-French War (1803–1815) – part of the Napoleonic Wars and their peripheral conflicts
 Anglo-Vichy French War (1940–42) – part of WWII; note that Britain fought alongside Free France against Vichy France

Crises
Events that nearly brought the two countries to war:
 Corsican Crisis
 Falklands Crisis
 Nootka Crisis
 Rio Nuñez incident
 Fashoda Incident
 Levant Crisis

See also
 France–United Kingdom relations
 1993 Cherbourg incident
 Attack on Mers-el-Kébir
 Auld Alliance
 English Channel scallop fishing dispute
 Entente Cordiale
 Second Hundred Years' War

Bibliography and external links
 
 

 
Lists of wars
Wars involving England
Wars involving France